Acetobacter cerevisiae is a species of Gram negative acetic acid bacteria. Its type strain is LMG 1625T (= DSM 14362T = NCIB 8894T = ATCC 23765T).

History 
The species was identified in 2002  by DNA-DNA hybridization as a group of related strains previously designated Acetobacter pasteurianus which were closely related to one another but not to other A. pasteurianus strains. These strains were all originally isolated from breweries.

References

Further reading

External links

LPSN
Type strain of Acetobacter cerevisiae at BacDive -  the Bacterial Diversity Metadatabase

Rhodospirillales
Bacteria described in 2002